The year 598 BC was a year of the pre-Julian Roman calendar. In the Roman Empire, it was known as year 156 Ab urbe condita . The denomination 598 BC for this year has been used since the early medieval period, when the Anno Domini calendar era became the prevalent method in Europe for naming years.

Events
 Jehoiachin succeeds Jehoiakim as king of Judah.
 Traditional date for the foundation of Kamarina by settlers from Syracuse.

Births

Deaths
 Jehoiakim, king of Judah

References